Cangkou is a neighbourhood in the Licang District of Qingdao, Shandong, China. It was an administrative district of Qingdao from 1951 to 1994.

In 1938 the site of Guchengding was dug over during a fight.

It is the location of the Qingdao Cangkou Air Base and the nearby Qingdaobei Railway Station.

References 

Geography of Qingdao
Neighbourhoods in China